WGFW is a Religious formatted broadcast radio station licensed to Drakes Branch, Virginia, serving Farmville, Virginia.  WGFW is owned and operated by God's Final Call & Warning, Inc.

References

External links
 WGFW Online
 

2012 establishments in Virginia
Radio stations established in 2012
GFW
Radio 74 Internationale radio stations
Charlotte County, Virginia